Events in the year 1886 in Portugal.

Incumbents
Monarch: Luís I 
President of the Council of Ministers: Fontes Pereira de Melo (until 20 February), José Luciano de Castro (from 20 February)

Events
 12 May - Angola is incorporated as a colony.
 19 May - Creation of the Duke of Albuquerque title.
 Homosexuality is criminalized.
 Completion of the Monument to the Restorers, in Restauradores Square, Lisbon.

Births
 29 January - Henrique de Sommer, industrialist (died 1944)
 14 February - Luís Wittnich Carrisso, botanist (died 1937)
 3 March - António Silva, actor (died 1971)

Deaths
 19 July - Cesário Verde, poet (born 1855)

See also
List of colonial governors in 1886#Portugal

References

 
Portugal
Years of the 19th century in Portugal
Portugal